Image persistence, or image retention, is the LCD and plasma display equivalent of screen burn-in. Unlike screen burn, the effects are usually temporary and often not visible without close inspection. Plasma displays experiencing severe image persistence can result in screen burn-in instead.

Image persistence can occur as easily as having something remain unchanged on the screen in the same location for a duration of even 10 minutes, such as a web page or document. Minor cases of image persistence are generally only visible when looking at darker areas on the screen, and usually invisible to the eye during ordinary computer use.

Cause

Liquid crystals have a natural relaxed state. When a voltage is applied they rearrange themselves to block certain light waves. If left with the same voltage for an extended period of time (e.g. displaying a pointer or the Taskbar in one place, or showing a static picture for extended periods of time), the liquid crystals can develop a tendency to stay in one position. This ever-so-slight tendency to stay arranged in one position can throw the requested color off by a slight degree, which causes the image to look like the traditional "burn-in" on phosphor based displays. In fact, the root cause of LCD image persistence is the same as phosphor burn-in, namely, non-uniform usage of the display's pixels.

The cause of this tendency is unclear. It might be due to accumulation of ionic impurities inside the LCD, electric charge building up near the electrodes, parasitic capacitance, or "a DC voltage component that occurs unavoidably in some display pixels owing to anisotropy in the dielectric constant of the liquid crystal".

Prevention and treatment

Image persistence can be reversed by allowing the liquid crystals to relax and return to their relaxed state, such as by turning off the monitor for a sufficiently long period of time (at least a few hours). For most minor cases, simply continuing to use the computer as usual (and thus allowing other colors to "cover" the affected regions) or turning off the monitor for the night is more than enough. One strategy for users looking to avoid image persistence artifacts is to vary the activities performed on a computer to avoid static colors and hide elements on the screen which are displayed perpetually (such as an OS's Taskbar). Another strategy is the usage of a screensaver to help during times the computer is left unattended. Covering the entire display area with pure white for an extended period of time is also a useful proactive solution.

References

External links
 Article on LCD image persistence

Display technology
Liquid crystal displays